Karád is a village in Somogy county, Hungary.

The settlement is part of the Balatonboglár wine region.

Etymology
Its name derives from the Turkish person name, Kara. He could be the first owner of the settlement. The same applies to Kára.

History
According to László Szita the settlement was completely Hungarian in the 18th century.

Culture
The Hungarian folk songs Fót hátán fót, egy üngöm vót (in 1938) and A karádi faluvégen (in 1933) were collected in Karád by Gyula Dávid as well as Rén a bárány (in 1953) by László Vikár.

External links 
 Street map (Hungarian)

References 

Populated places in Somogy County